Kenneth Henry Fields (born February 9, 1962) is an American former professional basketball player who was selected by the Milwaukee Bucks in the first round (21st pick overall) of the 1984 NBA draft. A 6'5" guard-forward from UCLA, Fields played in 4 seasons in the NBA from 1984 to 1988. He played for the Bucks and Los Angeles Clippers. His best year as a pro came during the 1986–87 season when he split time with the Bucks and Clippers, appearing in 48 games and averaging 8.2 ppg.  Fields also played parts of two seasons in the Continental Basketball Association with three teams.

NBA career statistics

Regular season

|-
| align="left" | 1984–85
| align="left" | Milwaukee
| 51 || 1 || 10.5 || .440 || .000 || .750 || 1.6 || 0.7 || 0.2 || 0.2 || 3.8
|-
| align="left" | 1985–86
| align="left" | Milwaukee
| 78 || 3 || 14.4 || .513 || .000 || .689 || 2.6 || 1.0 || 0.7 || 0.2 || 6.4
|-
| align="left" | 1986–87
| align="left" | Milwaukee
| 4 || 0 || 5.5 || .750 || .000 || .200 || 0.5 || 0.3 || 0.3 || 0.0 || 3.3
|-
| align="left" | 1986–87
| align="left" | Los Angeles
| 44 || 17 || 19.6 || .445 || .250 || .809 || 3.3 || 1.4 || 0.7 || 0.3 || 8.7
|-
| align="left" | 1987–88
| align="left" | Los Angeles
| 7 || 0 || 22.0 || .444 || .000 || .769 || 4.1 || 1.4 || 0.7 || 0.3 || 7.4
|- class="sortbottom"
| style="text-align:center;" colspan="2"| Career
| 184 || 21 || 14.6 || .474 || .188 || .733 || 2.5 || 1.0 || 0.5 || 0.2 || 6.2
|}

Playoffs

|-
| align="left" | 1985–86
| align="left" | Milwaukee
| 12 || 4 || 13.2 || .551 || .333 || .522 || 2.3 || 0.8 || 0.7 || 0.0 || 7.4
|}

References

External links

1962 births
Living people
African-American basketball players
All-American college men's basketball players
American expatriate basketball people in the Philippines
American men's basketball players
Basketball players from Iowa
Grand Rapids Hoops players
Great Taste Coffee Makers players
Los Angeles Clippers players
McDonald's High School All-Americans
Milwaukee Bucks draft picks
Milwaukee Bucks players
Parade High School All-Americans (boys' basketball)
Philippine Basketball Association imports
Rochester Flyers players
Shooting guards
Small forwards
Sportspeople from Iowa City, Iowa
Tulsa Fast Breakers players
UCLA Bruins men's basketball players
Verbum Dei High School alumni
21st-century African-American people
20th-century African-American sportspeople